Matthew Kennedy is an Australian former professional rugby league footballer who played for the Newcastle Knights in the 2000s. He last played for the Western Suburbs Rosellas of the Newcastle Rugby League.

Is a now a founding member and presidents secretary of the Newcastle inner west craft beer club.

Playing career
Kennedy made his first grade debut for Newcastle against the Sydney Roosters in round 2 of the 2003 NRL season.  Kennedy played 16 games in his debut season including the 36-8 qualifying loss against the same opponents.  

In 2005, Kennedy was one of 11 players fined by the club for misconduct after a pre-season game in Bathurst.

It was alleged that some of the Newcastle players had broken curfew to visit dormitories at Charles Sturt University.  It was reported that one of the players had jumped on a student as she slept in her bed and touched her inappropriately.  One of the Newcastle players Dane Tilse was deregistered by the NRL for 12 months.

2005 would also be Kennedy's last season in first grade.  Kennedy made 8 appearances that season (All of them losses) as Newcastle claimed the wooden spoon after finishing bottom of the table.

References

External links
NRL profile
http://www.rugbyleagueproject.org/players/Matthew_Kennedy/summary.html

1981 births
Living people
Australian rugby league players
Newcastle Knights players
Rugby league players from Nambour, Queensland
Rugby league props
Rugby league second-rows
Western Suburbs Rosellas players